In the Bleak Midwinter (released in the US as A Midwinter's Tale) is a 1995 British romantic comedy film written and directed by Kenneth Branagh. Many of the roles in the film were written for specific actors. This was the first film directed by Branagh in which he did not appear.

The film begins with a monologue by out-of-work actor Joe Harper (Michael Maloney) about his slow decline into depression. In an attempt to beat his depression, Joe volunteers to help try to save his sister's local church from land developers for the community by putting on a Christmas production of Hamlet, somewhat against the advice of his agent Margaretta (Joan Collins). As the cast he assembles are still available even at Christmas and are prepared to do it on a 'profit sharing' basis (that is, they may not get paid anything), he cannot expect – and does not get – the cream of the cream. But although they all bring their own problems and foibles along, something bigger starts to emerge in the perhaps aptly named village of Hope. This film encapsulates the hilarious and heartbreaking struggle of actor versus situation versus life, and often versus each other. It was shot in black and white for artistic effect.

Plot 

Joe Harper, a depressed and down-on-his-luck actor, asks his agent Margaretta D'Arcy to lend him some money to put on a final stand Christmastime production of Shakespeare's Hamlet in his hometown of Hope, Derbyshire. Wanting the rendition to be "free and experimental", Joe holds auditions that attract a variety of actors and performers, most of whom Margaretta thinks are mad. In the end, Joe casts six actors: the short-sighted and well-meaning Nina Raymond as Ophelia; the long-suffering and cynical Henry Wakefield as King Claudius; the flamboyant homosexual Terry DuBois as Queen Gertrude; the vain and self-righteous Tom Newman as Laertes, Fortinbras and other various roles; alcoholic-in-denial Carnforth Greville as Horatio and Bernardo; and former child actor Vernon Spatch as Polonius, Marcellus, and the First Gravedigger. Joe casts himself as Hamlet.

Recruiting his sister Molly, Joe transports the actors and props to Hope, where they mistakenly go to the wrong site before being brought to their actual venue: a decrepit, damp and ugly church that is due for demolition by developers. Although the actors are disheartened that the venue is also their digs as well as not having expenses paid for them, they decide to stay; and Joe introduces them to their costume and set designer, the enigmatic and new-age Fadge, who oddly proposes to have some of the audience as cardboard figurines and use only smoke for set design.

Rehearsals begin with a shaky start. Carnforth cannot remember his lines and often turns up drunk, Tom insists on using different outrageous accents for each of his various roles, Henry having to share a room with Terry whom he despises, Nina causes accidents from her eyesight, and Joe having Molly perform as Hamlet during rehearsals so he can watch and direct the scenes. More difficulties arise when the landlord of the church demands an extra week of rent, which Joe doesn't have, and the show hasn't sold a single advance ticket. After the first week of rehearsals and four days before the tech run, Joe insists the actor's don't lose their nerve, and receives encouragement from Nina who Joe learns is a widow.

Vernon comes to Joe's rescue by giving out flyers, selling the tickets on the streets of Hope and at a country hotel he is performing a cabaret at. Henry and Terry gradually learn to tolerate each other through their mutual respect of Henry Irving, as well as Terry revealing he has an estranged son, Tim, through a one-night stand, making his role as Gertrude difficult as Joe encourages the actors to be the characters. However one night, Tom breaks down from Carnforth's mistakes, ranting at Joe for being pressured to not do any variety for his multiple roles and then at Vernon for documenting the production. Joe himself also suffers a breakdown, admitting that the production was a mistake, that it has become too personal for them all, their time has run out and that he has no money to pay for them nor securing the venue for the run of the show. Calming down, Henry and Molly reassure him to continue.

With Joe now acting during the rehearsals, the actors find the production has improved significantly, with Vernon revealing to Joe that the company has had a whip-round to improve the financial situation. After the technical rehearsal, Joe receives a call from Margaretta, who tells him that he has rather unexpectedly been offered a three-picture movie deal from American producer Nancy Crawford, but has to cut off when she tells him about travel arrangements. On Christmas Eve and the night of the first performance, Margaretta arrives early to tell Joe that he has to leave the very same night to catch a flight to Los Angeles with Crawford - meaning he will be absent from the first performance. The company begrudgingly say their farewells to Joe, with Molly filling for Hamlet and Nina tearfully begging for Joe to stay for his well being to no avail.

The audience arrives, including Carnforth's mother, Nina's father and Tim (who Henry had contacted, telling him that Terry had cholera). Crawford and Margaretta also arrive along with a national newspaper reporter, and during Molly's first scene Joe returns, having been allowed to do the first performance to let Crawford see him act live. The production goes well and is rapturously received, and as the company meet backstage they are met by Crawford, who reveals that she only watched the performance to see why Joe rejected her offer. Instead, she offers Tom Joe's role and has Fadge brought along as a designer for the film, with Margaretta offering herself as an agent to them. Before she leaves, Margaretta does compliment Joe on his performance.

When the audience leaves, the company dances with each other, and Nina and Joe begin a relationship as Christmas Day begins.

Cast

Reception

Critical response 

Roger Ebert, noted critic of the Chicago Sun-Times, gave the film three out of four stars, praising the performances and Branagh's screenplay. James Berardinelli praised the film, giving it three-and-a-half out of four stars, stating, "No current film maker appears to love and understand Shakespeare as well as Branagh, and never has his affection for the Bard been more apparent than here. This picture succeeds as a comedy, a satire, and even, to a certain extent, as a mild melodrama about choosing between a paycheck and the nourishment of the soul."  Berardinelli concluded, "Anyone who wondered about Branagh's future following Frankenstein can set their concerns to rest. He's back on top in the independent arena with A Midwinter's Tale, a film that offers ninety-eight minutes of pure fun re-interpreting the phrase 'the play's the thing'."

Box office
In the UK, it grossed £235,302 in its first month of release. In the United States and Canada it grossed $469,571.

Accolades 
As a competitive entry at the 52nd Venice International Film Festival in 1995, In the Bleak Midwinter was among the finalists for the Golden Lion award, and Kenneth Branagh received the Golden Osella for Best Director.

References

External links 

 
 
 The webpage for the script in book form from Newmarket Press 

1995 films
1995 romantic comedy films
British black-and-white films
British romantic comedy films
Films based on Hamlet
Films set in Derbyshire
Films directed by Kenneth Branagh
Films produced by David Barron
Sony Pictures Classics films
1990s English-language films
1990s British films